Apple Black is an American/Nigerian original English-language manga series written by and illustrated by Odunze Oguguo/Whyt Manga. Apple Black has been serialized bi-weekly in MyFutprint Entertainment's Saturday AM since December 2014, with the chapters collected into three volumes as of December 2022.

Plot
Many years ago, humans acquired “Black” fruits from a tree that descended from the skies, turning humans into sorcerers. Although all of Black is now extinct, humans still have sorcery inherited from their ancestors. Blessed with the Arodihs arm by Merlin, the god of sorcery, Sano is raised and trained in isolation and secrecy to be the world’s savior, known as the Trinity. The savior is the one who dawns the Infinite Night, an eternal night of chaos. With his newfound freedom from isolation, Sano gets a fiery start after being admitted to Black Bottom Island’s guild for young sorcerers. As his fellow gifted allies and sorcerers like Opal Wantmore accompany Sano on his quest, the treachery, betrayal, and evil that have plagued nearly all of Eden again threaten the world. 
Sano fears his power can either save the world or destroy it. With his visions offering him a darker path, Sano seeks to find those responsible for his loss, and walk away from revenge and toward forgiveness to find closure. Ridding Eden of the Infinite Night will require him to uncover the secrets behind his father’s research on fully rejuvenating the effects of Black in bloodlines with the immense power known as "Apple Black."

Characters
Sano Bengote Tamashii
Opal Wantmore
Ruby 'Ryuzaki The Great"
Symon
Obinna D. Emeluwa
Lily Dardanelle
Neona "Neon" Mercury
Osamu Shimojigoku
Mikael Barouge
Madam Naomi Barogue
Angelo Dominik Rimokon
Willow Wantmore
Gideon Banburi
Prince Ceazar Ashokahn
Sir. Jekyl
Miss Kiki Gonzaleth
Sir. Jackoby
Lady Fulanii Haruna
Grudon Fattimunga
Sofia Miri

Publication
Written by and illustrated by Odunze Oguguo, also known as "Whyt Manga," Apple Black began serialization in Saturday AMs on December 18, 2014. Both MyFutprint Entertainment and Rockport Publishers are releasing the series in English the same day it is published.

Volume list

Reception
In Kirkus Reviews, for Volume 1: "Neo Freedom", they wrote that as the first installment, it's "an inventive series opener with promise." In summary, Sano Bengote Tamashii is a young sorcerer who has just started attending a school for sorcerers called Newgarth. He has been isolated for most of his life and has trouble interacting with his classmates. There are rumors that Sano may be the one prophesied to bring salvation to the continent of Eden, which is trapped in a cycle of vengeance as the power of the Black wanes. The story is set in a complex and intricate world with magic and hierarchy and is told through a mix of color and black-and-white illustrations. The main characters are depicted as having light skin, while many of the secondary characters appear to be Black or South Asian. The story combines humor and action. Additionally, for Volume 2: "Sunny Eyes", they wrote that this volume is "a total rush for manga fans seeking something off the beaten path." The second volume of the manga series continues the story of young Sano, who has mysterious powers embodied in his ebony arm known as Arodihs, and the factions that are competing for control of these powers. A new character, Opal Wantmore, arrives on the scene and becomes involved in a rebel faction's plan to take over the young sorcerers' guild and use Sano and Arodihs for their own nefarious purposes. The plot is driven by action and includes many characters, some of whom are introduced abruptly. The illustrations in the book are in black and white and depict characters of various skin tones. A glossary is included to help explain some of the details of Sano's world, but it is hoped that this will be expanded in future volumes. The book is likely to be appealing to fans of manga for its diverse cast of characters and intricate plot.

Notes

References

External links
 Apple Black on Pilot Manga
 Apple Black on the Official Saturday-AM website

2014 comics debuts
Shōnen manga